Abe Vigoda was an American punk rock band based in Los Angeles, California, United States, originally from Chino, California; a city in the Inland Empire. They frequently performed at the Smell.

History
The band formed right after the members finished high school. The name is a reference to Abe Vigoda. Skeleton, Abe Vigoda's third album, was released on July 8, 2008. In 2009, the EP Reviver followed. They finished recording their fourth album titled Crush on February 24, 2010, and it was released on September 20, 2010, and was ranked 40th on Pitchfork Media's list The Top 50 Albums of 2010. Their album, Crush was a full transition for the band from their earlier sounds.

Style
Some critics compared their music to another band, Vampire Weekend.

Discography

Albums
 Sky Route/Star Roof (2006)
 Kid City (2007)
 Skeleton (2008)
 Crush (2010)

EPs
 Reviver (2009)

7" vinyl
 Abe Vigoda / Child Pornography (2006)
 Abe Vigoda / Mikaela's Fiend (2007)
 Animal Ghosts (2007)

References

External links
 [ bio] on AllMusic
 Abe Vigoda on Myspace
 Abe Vigoda makes a guest appearance on Radio Happy Hour and plays a song

American noise rock music groups
Indie rock musical groups from California
Musical groups from Los Angeles
Bella Union artists
2004 establishments in California